Antoni "Toni" Lima Solà (born 22 September 1970) is a retired professional footballer who played as a central defender.

Early life
Born in Gavà, Barcelona, Catalonia to an Andalusian father and a Catalan mother, Lima's family moved to Andorra when he was nine years old.

Club career
Lima had a brief spell with Real Madrid Castilla, then signed with RCD Español, for which he played two La Liga games. In 1992, he stayed in his native region and spent three seasons with Palamós CF in the Segunda División, being relegated in the last.

After another season in the second division, with CP Almería, Lima spent the remainder of his Spanish career in the Segunda División B or lower. He also had two abroad experiences: in 1998 he joined C.F. União, appearing rarely as the Portuguese second-tier team was also relegated. Three years later, also with no impact whatsoever, he represented Ionikos F.C. in the Super League Greece.

Lima retired at SE Eivissa-Ibiza in 2008 at the age of 37, having acted as the club's director of football still as an active player. He later worked with Premier League sides Manchester United and Arsenal as well as Inter Milan of Serie A as scout, and Deportivo Alavés as director of international football.

International career
Lima won 64 caps for Andorra over a 12-year period. On 10 June 2009, in his last international, a 6–0 loss to England for the 2010 FIFA World Cup qualifiers at Wembley Stadium, he wore the captain's armband.

In September 2005, Lima was subject of some controversy during a World Cup qualification match against the Netherlands. When Ruud van Nistelrooy missed a penalty, the defender celebrated directly in front of the Dutch player. Moments later, the striker scored from open play and ran straight over to Lima with his arms raised, being booked for his action in an eventual 4–0 win.

International goal
Scores and results list Andorra's goal tally first, score column indicates score after each Lima goal.

Personal life
Lima's younger brother, Ildefons, is also a footballer and a defender. He too spent most of his career in the lower leagues of Spain, and the pair shared teams at Ionikos.

References

External links

1970 births
Living people
People from Gavà
Andorran people of Spanish descent
Andorran people of Catalan descent
Spanish emigrants to Andorra
Naturalised citizens of Andorra
Sportspeople from the Province of Barcelona
Andorran footballers
Spanish footballers
Footballers from Catalonia
Association football defenders
La Liga players
Segunda División players
Segunda División B players
Tercera División players
CF Damm players
FC Barcelona C players
Real Madrid Castilla footballers
CE L'Hospitalet players
RCD Espanyol footballers
Palamós CF footballers
CP Almería players
Real Murcia players
CF Gavà players
Amurrio Club footballers
SE Eivissa-Ibiza B players
Liga Portugal 2 players
C.F. União players
Super League Greece players
Ionikos F.C. players
Andorra international footballers
Catalonia international footballers
Andorran expatriate footballers
Expatriate footballers in Portugal
Expatriate footballers in Greece
Andorran expatriate sportspeople in Spain
Inter Milan non-playing staff
Manchester United F.C. non-playing staff
Arsenal F.C. non-playing staff